This article includes the 2014 ITF Men's Circuit tournaments which occurred between January and March 2014.

Point distribution

Key

Month
January

 February 

 March

References

External links
 International Tennis Federation official website

 01-03